Based in Louisville, Kentucky, the Louisville Bach Society is a regional chorus that specializes in performing the works of Johann Sebastian Bach.

History
Inspired by their studies with world-renowned Bach expert, Helmut Walcha, Melvin and Margaret Dickinson founded the Louisville Bach Society.

The Louisville Bach Society's performance season runs roughly from early October to early April. Performances are held at venues throughout the region. They specialize in pieces by Bach as their name suggests, but they also perform pieces by many other famous composers.

The Louisville Bach Society is known for it youth and community outreach. They regularly work with the youth choirs throughout Louisville, such as the Louisville Youth Choir, and the West Louisville Boys Choir

Besides, the Louisville Bach Society is a member of the Louisville Fund for the Arts.

Notes

External links
 Official website
 Fund for the Arts Bach Society

Choirs in Louisville, Kentucky
1964 establishments in Kentucky
Bach choirs
Musical groups established in 1964